The piano nobile (Italian for "noble floor" or "noble level", also sometimes referred to by the corresponding French term, bel étage) is the principal floor of a palazzo. This floor contains the main reception and bedrooms of the house.

Characteristics
The piano nobile is usually the first floor (in European terminology; second floor in American terms) or sometimes the second storey and contains major rooms, located above the rusticated ground floor containing the minor rooms and service rooms. The reasons were so that the rooms above the ground floor would have finer views and to avoid the dampness and odours of the street level. That is especially true in Venice, where the piano nobile of the many palazzi is especially obvious from the exterior by virtue of its larger windows and balconies and open loggias. Examples are Ca' Foscari, Ca' d'Oro, Ca' Vendramin Calergi and Palazzo Barbarigo.

Larger windows than those on other floors are usually the most obvious feature of the piano nobile. In England and Italy, the piano nobile is often reached by an ornate outer staircase, which avoided for the floor's inhabitants of the need to enter the house by the servant's floor below. Kedleston Hall is an example of this in England, as is Villa Capra "La Rotonda" in Italy.

Most houses contained a secondary floor above the piano nobile, which contained more intimate withdrawing and bedrooms for private use by the family of the house when no honoured guests were present. Above that floor would often be an attic floor containing staff bedrooms.

The arrangement of floors continued throughout Europe as large houses continued to be built in the classical style. The arrangement was designed at Buckingham Palace as recently as the mid-19th century. Holkham Hall, Osterley Park and Chiswick House are among the innumerable 18th-century English houses that employed the design.

Secondo piano nobile

In Italy, especially in Venetian palazzi, the floor above the piano nobile is sometimes referred to as the "secondo piano nobile" (second principal floor), especially if the loggias and balconies reflect those below on a slightly smaller scale. In those instances and occasionally in museums, the principal piano nobile is described as the primo piano nobile to differentiate it.

Beletage

In Germany, there is the Beletage (meaning "beautiful storey", from the French term bel étage), which fulfilled the same function as the piano nobile. Both date to the 17th century.

References 

Copplestone, Trewin (1963). World Architecture. Hamlyn.

Dal Lago, Adalbert (1966). Ville Antiche. Milan: Fratelli Fabbri.

Halliday, E. E. (1967). Cultural History of England. London: Thames and Hudson.
Harris, John; de Bellaigue, Geoffrey; & Miller, Oliver (1968). Buckingham Palace.
 Hussey, Christopher (1955). English Country Houses: Early Georgian 1715–1760 London, Country Life.
Jackson-Stops, Gervase (1990). The Country House in Perspective. Pavilion Books Ltd.
Kaminski Marion, Art and Architecture of Venice, 1999, Könemann, 
London:Nelson. 

Architectural elements
Floors